
Gmina Koronowo is an urban-rural gmina (administrative district) in Bydgoszcz County, Kuyavian-Pomeranian Voivodeship, in north-central Poland.

Villages
Apart from the town of Koronowo, Gmina Koronowo contains the villages and settlements of Aleksandrowiec, Bieskowo, Buszkowo, Byszewo, Bytkowice, Dąbrowice, Dziedzinek, Glinki, Gogolin, Gogolinek, Gościeradz, Grabino, Huta, Iwickowo, Krąpiewo, Łakomowo, Łąsko Małe, Łąsko Wielkie, Lipinki, Lucim, Mąkowarsko, Mąkowarsko PGR, Młynkowiec, Morzewiec, Nowy Dwór, Nowy Jasiniec, Okole, Osiek, Popielewo, Romanowo, Różanna, Salno, Samociążek, Sitowiec, Skarbiewo, Sokole-Kuźnica, Srebrnica, Stary Dwór, Stopka, Tryszczyn, Tryszczyn-Elektrownia, Tuszyny, Wierzchucin Królewski, Więzowno, Wilcza Góra, Wilcze, Wiskitno, Witoldowo and Wtelno.

Neighbouring gminas
Gmina Koronowo is bordered by the gminas of Dobrcz, Gostycyn, Lubiewo, Osielsko, Pruszcz, Sicienko, Sośno and Świekatowo.

References
Polish official population figures 2006

Koronowo
Bydgoszcz County